A fursona is a personalized animal character created by someone in the furry fandom. Fursonas may be anthropomorphic personas, idealized versions of their owners, fleshed out roleplay characters, or simply digital mascots. The vast majority of furries have fursonas; the Anthropomorphic Research Project states that nearly every furry has a fursona, and The New Science of Narcissism estimates that 95% of the fandom have a fursona. The Anthropomorphic Research Project additionally states that the average furry has between two and three fursonas over the course of their life.

Individuals' fursonas are acted out primarily online, but also at furry conventions and in other public spaces. Acting out one's fursona in person may involve wearing a fursuit.  A small minority of furries express a desire to become, or already see themselves as, their fursona's species. These people may additionally identify as therians or otherkin.

History and etymology 
The term "fursona" is a portmanteau of the words "furry" and "persona".  While the precise origins of the term are unknown, it had become commonplace in the fandom by the mid-1990s.

Fursona species 
Despite the name, fursonas may be any animal species. They can also be mythological, fictional, or hybrid creatures.

According to the Anthropomorphic Research Project, the most common fursona species are wolves, foxes, dogs, big cats, and dragons. Less common are rodents, rabbits, reptiles, birds and horses. Furries rarely identify with nonhuman primates.

Fursona creation 
The creation of a fursona has been described as "one of the most universal behaviours in the furry fandom". One study found that furries also tend to create fursonas to distinguish themselves from each other.

Although the inspiration varies from individual to individual, many furries describe their fursona being inspired by their favorite media or mythology. However, the majority state that their fursona was primarily internally generated. The majority of furries also cite shared characteristic as a reason for choosing a particular species. These are usually archetypal traits as ascribed to the species by humans, as opposed to actual animal behaviours. Some popular fursona species are particularly strongly associated with certain traits, for example, dogs being considered ‘loyal’ or rabbits being considered ‘promiscuous’.

Some furries state that they simply have an innate connection to their chosen species. A small minority believes that their chosen species was a past life, is a spirit guide, or that they were supposed to be born as such. These notions overlap strongly with the experiences of otherkinity and therianthropy.

Furries often take a long time to decide on their fursona. 25-50% of furries surveyed have had more than one fursona over the course of their lives, and about 25% stated that they had more than one concurrently. Furries with multiple fursonas usually do not see them as representing multiple selves, but facets of the same self, possibly related to how they express themselves in different social contexts. Additionally, a fursona’s characteristics may change over time along with its owner. This is usually in personality, but species may change as well.

Just as art is central to the furry fandom in general, it also plays a critical role in the creation and representation of fursonas. Furries who are not artistic themselves may commission artwork of their fursona from other members of the fandom as part of the creation process.

Relationship with self 
Jake Dunn argues that a furry’s fursona cannot be separated from their own sense of self, and many furries in fact see the performance of their fursona as a way of being their ‘truest’ self.

On average, furries rate their fursonas higher on all dimensions of the big five personality traits. They view their fursonas as having more desirable traits than they do, and fewer undesirable traits. Various researchers suggest that there is an extent to which fursonas serve as idealized versions of their owners. Projecting this idealized self can ease social tensions and reduce social anxiety. Dunn also argues that eventually, these idealized traits are incorporated back into the self. While he notes that the most common idealized traits given to fursonas are also considered ideal by society at large, S. E. Roberts et al hypothesize that to some, fursonas serve as a safe way to explore traits that are socially undesirable.

Furries are often highly concerned with their fursona being unique. When they deem that their fursona has been ‘copied’, their sense of self may be threatened.

Furries may use their fursonas to explore their conceptualization of their gender and presentation, and some furries' fursonas have a different gender, age, or sexual orientation than their own. Transgender individuals with a sense of gender identity and generalized identity that does not match their physical appearance and/or sex assigned at birth frequently possess a fursona or fursonas that present their idealized selves. Similar situations exist for those with other kinds of body dysphoria and related struggles.

References

External links 

Fursona at WikiFur

Furry fandom